John McInally (born 17 May 1915, date of death unknown) was a Scottish professional footballer who played as an inside forward.

Career
Born in Blantyre, McInally played for Wishaw Juniors, Celtic, Arbroath, Cowdenbeath and Ballymena United

McInally is deceased.

References

1915 births
Date of death missing
Scottish footballers
Wishaw Juniors F.C. players
Celtic F.C. players
Arbroath F.C. players
Cowdenbeath F.C. players
Ballymena United F.C. players
Scottish Football League players
Association football inside forwards
People from Blantyre, South Lanarkshire
Footballers from South Lanarkshire